Events in the year 2017 in Yemen.

Incumbents
President: Abdrabbuh Mansur Hadi 
Prime Minister: Ahmed Obeid bin Daghr

Events

Ongoing – the Yemeni Crisis (2011–present)
25 June –  The World Health Organization estimates that Yemen has more than 200,000 cases of Cholera.
14 August – The WHO suspects cholera cases in Yemen hit 500,000 mark.

Deaths

 14 August – Nearly 2000 people have died since the cholera outbreak began to spread rapidly at the end of April.

4 December – Ali Abdullah Saleh, politician, President of North Yemen 1978–1990 and President of Yemen 1990–2012 (b. 1947).

References 

 
2010s in Yemen
Years of the 21st century in Yemen
Yemen
Yemen